LaLola is a Philippine television drama fantasy comedy series broadcast by GMA Network. The series is based on a 2007 Argentine television series of the same title. Directed by Dominic Zapata and Jun Lana, it stars Rhian Ramos and JC de Vera. It premiered on October 13, 2008 on the network's Telebabad line up replacing Ako si Kim Samsoon. The series concluded on February 6, 2009 with a total of 85 episodes.

Premise
Lazaro "Lalo" Lobregat is the president of Distelleria Lobregat. He is regarded as the metro's most eligible bachelor not to mention, a heartbreaker. He is a little bit insensitive about some things especially about the feelings of women. There is still a bit of conscience in him, but he is too preoccupied to notice his "inner good" because of his cool cars and hot chicks. But when his ex-fling Ada Romina killed herself because of him, everything in his perfect life will change. Sera Romina, Ada's sister is furious. All she knows is that he must pay. Unknown to Lalo, Sera and Ada are babaylans, magical beings that could conjure curses and spells with the power of the moon. With a cursed kiss from Sera, Lalo changes into a woman in a snap. Since nobody will believe his overnight sex change, except for his closet gay best friend Gary, he passes himself as Lola, Lalo's steady girlfriend, to which everyone has a hard time believing. With a new body, he finds out how hard it is to be a woman, experiencing the same chauvinism he used to inflict on women. With each passing day, every inch of Lalo starts to fade, physically and emotionally, and starts to develop real female characteristics like menstruation. As if that's not hard enough, she starts to develop feelings to Lalo's office mate and complete opposite, Facundo Diaz. He also discovers the deep dark secrets of Distelleria Lobregat and his identity, not to mention an angry babaylan magically trying to destroy her even more.

Cast and characters

Lead cast
 JC de Vera as Facundo Diaz
 Rhian Ramos as Lolita "Lola" P. Diaz

Supporting cast
 Eddie Garcia as Aguirre Lobregat
 Jackie Lou Blanco as Griselda Lobregat
 Marvin Agustin as Gaston S. Lobregat
 Angelika dela Cruz as Sabrina Starr
 Wendell Ramos as Lazaro "Lalo" Lobregat
 Marky Cielo as Billy Lobregat
 Keempee de Leon as Graciano "Gary" T. Fuentebella
 Eula Valdez as Susanna F. Lobregat
 Lovi Poe as Julia Fuentebella
 Gladys Reyes as Iris Diaz
 Isabel Granada as Tala Romina

Guest cast
 Iza Calzado as Sera Romina
 Ian Veneracion as Emilio Lobregat
 Jewel Mische as Ada Romina

Ratings
According to AGB Nielsen Philippines' Mega Manila household television ratings, the pilot episode of LaLola earned a 35.8% rating. While the final episode scored a 40% rating.

References

External links
 

2008 Philippine television series debuts
2009 Philippine television series endings
Filipino-language television shows
GMA Network drama series
Philippine romantic comedy television series
Philippine television series based on non-Philippine television series
Television shows set in the Philippines